"Walk the Dinosaur" is a song by Was (Not Was), released in 1987, from their album What Up, Dog?

Song info
The tune features a tight, funky sound, punctuated by horns and a cowbell.

When released in the UK in 1987, the song reached No. 10 on the singles chart, becoming the group's first UK top 10 hit. The music video featured four scantily clad 'cavewomen' dancing  while a Flintstones-style TV played clips from Daffy Duck and the Dinosaur. Modern people danced to the song during the "Everybody kill the dinosaur" part. The video received heavy rotation on MTV. The song reached No. 7 on the US chart in 1989, two years after its UK success and became the band's biggest hit single in their home country.

According to an interview with co-writer Randy Jacobs, it "was an infectious sing-along with a Flintstonesque video that probably got played on MTV way too much. But even that seemingly good-time anthem had a dark side. [...] The song's about nuclear Armageddon. It became a dance (anthem) because of the video. They connected it with the girls in the little Pebbles and Bam-Bam outfits. All the sudden it became, like, 'do the mashed potato' or 'the twist.'"

Track listing
7" vinyl
 "Walk the Dinosaur" – 3:38
 "11 Miles an Hour (Abe Zapp Ruder Version)" – 4:04

7" vinyl / Cassette (US)
 "Walk the Dinosaur" – 3:38
 "Wedding Vows in Vegas" – 3:38

12" vinyl (1) / CD (1) (Europe)
 "Walk the Dinosaur (The New York Dangerous Mix)" – 6:58
 "Walk the Dinosaur (Bruce's Prehistoric Dub)" – 6:43
 "11 Miles an Hour (Abe Zapp Ruder Version)" – 4:04

12" vinyl (2) (UK)
 "Walk the Dinosaur (Jeffrey B. Young Hearts Run Free Remix)" – 6:08
 "Walk the Dinosaur (A-Cappella Saurus)" – 3:46
 "Walk the Dinosaur (Full Instrumental)" – 5:03
 "11 Miles an Hour (Abe Zapp Ruder Version)" – 4:04

12" vinyl (US)
 "Walk the Dinosaur (The New York Dangerous Version)" – 6:58
 "Walk the Dinosaur (Bruce's Prehistoric Dub)" – 6:43
 "Walk the Dinosaur (The Debunking Of Uri Geller Mix)" – 4:30
 "Walk the Dinosaur (7" Version)" – 3:38

CDV (2) (Europe)
 "Walk the Dinosaur (Jeffrey B. Young Hearts Run Free Remix)" – 6:08
 "Walk the Dinosaur (A-Cappella Saurus)" – 3:46
 "Walk the Dinosaur (Full Instrumental)" – 5:03
 "11 Miles an Hour (Abe Zapp Ruder Version)" – 4:03
 "Walk the Dinosaur (video)" – 3:36

Remixes
 "7" Version" – 3:38
 "The New York Dangerous Mix" – 6:58 – remixed by Bruce Forest.
 "Bruce's Prehistoric Dub" – 6:43 – remixed by Bruce Forest.
 "Jeffrey B. Young Hearts Run Free Remix" – 6:08 – remixed by Jeff Young.
 "A-Cappella Saurus" – 3:46 – mixed by Bruce Forest and Frank Heller.
 "Full Instrumental" – 5:03 – mixed by Bruce Forest and Frank Heller.
 "The Debunking of Uri Geller Mix" – 4:30 mixed by Don Was and Jamie Muhoberac.

Chart performance

Weekly charts

Year-end charts

In popular culture
The original recording of "Walk the Dinosaur" appeared on the soundtrack of the 1994 film The Flintstones.

A version performed by George Clinton appeared on the Super Mario Bros. soundtrack in 1993, and was also featured in the credits.

The song is one of the songs that can be heard playing at DinoLand U.S.A. at Disney's Animal Kingdom. Interesting enough, the song was even one of the sing-along songs with a few of the lyrics that have been changed for Flik's Musical Adventure at Disney's Animal Kingdom (1999) from the Disney Sing-Along Songs series.

In the movie Ice Age: Dawn of the Dinosaurs a version of the song by Queen Latifah (who also voices Ellie in the Ice Age franchise) appeared during the film and the credits. This version featured minor lyrical changes to make the song more family-friendly, notably substituting the word "slave" with "friend".

References

1987 songs
1987 singles
1989 singles
Chrysalis Records singles
Fontana Records singles
Funk songs
George Clinton (funk musician) songs
Phonogram Records singles
Song recordings produced by Don Was
Songs about dinosaurs
Songs about nuclear war and weapons
Songs written by David Was
Songs written by Don Was
Was (Not Was) songs